Majed Assiri [ماجد عسيري in Arabic] (born 27 April 1991) is a Saudi football player who plays as a left-back. He played in the Pro League for Al-Qadsiah and Al-Raed.

External links
 

Living people
1991 births
Saudi Arabian footballers
Association football defenders
Al-Ahli Saudi FC players
Al-Raed FC players
Al-Qadsiah FC players
Sportspeople from Jeddah
Saudi First Division League players
Saudi Professional League players